= G. G. Scott =

G. G. Scott may be:

- Sir George Gilbert Scott (1811–1878), 19th-century English architect
- Sir Giles Gilbert Scott (1880–1960), 20th-century English architect
